No Retreat, No Surrender 3: Blood Brothers (aka No Retreat, No Surrender 3) is a 1990 American action film directed by Lucas Lowe, and starring Loren Avedon and Keith Vitali. While financed by Seasonal Entertainment, the film does not continue the story of the original film No Retreat, No Surrender or the sequel, both directed by Corey Yuen. It is the third film in the No Retreat, No Surrender franchise.

Plot

A bank has been held hostage by terrorists with police surrounding the building. As the lead terrorist looks over at the hostages, a crippled hostage begins to beg for his life. When the crippled hostage is kicked down, it turns out to be a trick as his crutches are a projectile and a blade. The "hostage" is revealed to be CIA agent Casey Alexander, who in the process of saving the hostages, was shot in the arm, but is successful. We soon meet Casey's brother Will, who is a martial arts teacher who does a demonstration of using skills in real-life situations. When Will's father John calls him, Will asks what time the party starts and John asks if Will is willing to spend the weekend with him and his father. Will is reluctant, but accepts the offer.

Meanwhile, John, a retired CIA agent, looks up information on a man when he is approached by two men. He manages to tie one up and points his gun at the other. The other man is actually CIA agent Macpherson, John's longtime friend who pays him back for a bet on football. When Macpherson and John speak in his office, Macpherson reveals that John is on the hit list and the man happens to be the face on his computer screen. When John refuses protection, Macpherson accepts and tells John he will see him at the party.

The party is to celebrate John's 65th birthday. Alongside Macpherson is CIA director Jack Atteron, who jokingly bets who will get to sit next to the secretary for cake. Casey arrives with cast in arm from the shooting and talks briefly about the last mission. When Will shows up, he is wearing the Soviet flag on the back of his jean jacket. As Casey tries to show affection towards his brother, Will resists it. Things get worse when Casey tells his father that Will and he got him an around the world flight for his birthday. An angry Will leaves and when Casey follows him to talk to him, Will finally lets his anger out. He is mad that Casey won't admit that he is a spy and to stop acting like a hotshot with all his cash. Casey tells Will that he doesn't like the fact he's wearing "Khrushchev's jacket" in front of the CIA. Will drives off and John promises he will talk to Will. Casey leaves as well to take a friend home.

That night, John hears the door and hopes it is Will. However, when he doesn't get a reply, he is suspicious. He soon becomes attacked by some men dressed in black. John fights them off, even killing one in the process. When he opens a door, he is kicked down and two men are revealed. The face John saw earlier on his computer screen is Colombian terrorist Antonio "Franco" Franconi, who wants to get revenge on John for the death of his son in a mission years ago. Alongside Franco is his number one man, Russo, an agile martial artist. When Russo proves too powerful, John sees a gun. Franco challenges him to take it. When John reaches for the gun, Franco throws a dart, hitting John in the throat. Russo follows it up by kicking John into the indoor pool, dead. When Will and Casey discover their father's body, Will has had enough of Casey, who vows to find out who is responsible.

When Atteron refuses to give Casey his father's case, he seeks the means to find out himself by going through an old friend who works in the IT department. Casey learns that Franco is planning something major in Florida. As he heads home, he is confronted by another group of terrorists. Will, who happens to be there, helps Casey fend off the terrorists, but Casey shoots them all down. Casey tells Will to go to his apartment and gives him the file he received at the office on their father. While Casey talks with the police, Will opens the file and learns where Franco is. He decides to head to Florida to find Franco himself. When Casey discovers Will's plan, he heads to Florida as well, pretending to be on vacation.

Will meets up with some old friends at a martial arts school in Tampa and asks for their help in finding Angel, a recruiter for Franco's organization. Meanwhile, Casey, who tries to look for Will, begins to have a hunch that Will may actually find his way into the organization and goes to look for old girlfriend Maria, who is also infiltrating Franco. At a bar that night, Will arrives as does his friends, who challenge and beat up Angel's men. As Angel is about to be beaten down, Will faces off against his friends as part of the plan. Will calls himself "Jessie Roby" and Angel takes him to see Franco. When Franco meets "Jessie", he tests him by saying that Jessie is a spy for the government. Will, as Jessie, faces off against one thug but matches skills with Russo and passes the test. Will is given a major assignment the next day.

Will and two men go to a house where it is revealed that he must kill Casey. Will tells Casey that he has met Franco and that they have to make the fight look real. Will tells Casey something major is planned and he will let him know once he gets the word. Will "kills" Casey, who fakes strangulation by curtain. Upon returning to the base, Franco's supervisor wants to meet the man who killed Casey. When Will meets the supervisor, it is revealed to be Atteron, who was also responsible for his father's death. Casey soon finds himself kidnapped and the two are tied up and confronted by Russo and Franco. When Will sees Casey being beaten horrendously, he tells Franco he will not do the job if Casey is dead, prompting him to stop the beating.

The plot is to kidnap the Mozambique Ambassador, who will be arriving at Tampa International Airport, and give a set of demands. However, it is a distraction for the real plan, the assassination of President George H. W. Bush. Will is hired because of his impeccable martial arts skills. While Will plans the attack at the airport, Casey and a now kidnapped Maria, make their escape from Franco's men and head toward the airport. Casey catches up to Will and the Ambassador, whom they put on a plane with the engine on so they can find Franco and Russo, the latter armed with a rocket launcher aimed at Air Force One. The brothers find them and begin a showdown with them. Maria, who had seen Will as "Jessie", shoots Will in the shoulder and goes after him, only to be stopped by Casey. The two jump on the back of the truck where Franco and Russo are driving and then eventually stop at an airplane hangar.

At the airplane hangar, Casey tells Will they are going on a different sort of hunting trip. As the two search, Will is caught and is getting hit when Casey catches up. Casey takes on Franco and Will takes on Russo. The two duos fight it out when Russo heads on top of a scaffold with Will trailing him. On the scaffold, Will is able to outfight Russo and gives him a roundhouse kick to his face, causing Russo to fall to his death. Franco, who is revealed to be an agile fighter himself, jumps on the scaffold and knocks Will to the ground. Will is rescued by Casey when he lands on the ground, prompting Will to land on his back. Soon, Franco is taking on both Casey and Will. When Franco throws his dart, Will is hit in the shoulder. When Franco goes to throw another, Casey moves in the way and the dart deflects off his cast, which enables Will to kick it towards Franco, hitting him in the chest. As the brothers are about to go after Franco, they are stopped by Atteron, who shoots Franco in the face, killing him. Atteron admits he has planned to kill Franco after he had killed both Casey and Will. Both Will and Casey are upset by this as Atteron plans to kill them now to cover his tracks. A gunshot is heard, only to find that Atteron has been shot by Maria, who once again goes after "Jessie", until Casey reveals that Will is his brother. Maria is shocked but happy with the outcome. Casey goes as far as offering Will a job with the CIA, but Will laughs it off. As they open the airplane hangar, Macpherson, the CIA, and the Tampa police are all there with an arrested Angel. The brothers and Maria happily walk off towards a relieved Macpherson.

Cast

 Loren Avedon as Will Alexander
 Keith Vitali as Casey Alexander
 Joseph Campanella as John Alexander
 Rion Hunter as Antonio 'Franco' Franconi
 Mark Russo as Russo, Franco's Henchman
 Luke Askew as Jack Atteron
 David Michael Sterling as Angel
 Wanda Acuna as Maria
 Philip Benson as MacPherson
 Sherrie Rose as Jodie
 Aasif Mandvi as Terrorist
 Marc Macaulay as Terrorist

Production
The character of Casey Alexander was written to have a cast on his arm the day before shooting began. On that day, action director Tony Leung Siu-Hung asked Loren Avedon and Keith Vitali to show their martial arts skills for the choreography. When Avedon performed a double jump back kick to a punching bag, Leung asked Vitali if he can do that move. Vitali's attempt resulted in a broken wrist. Therefore, writer Keith W. Strandberg wrote it in that Casey was shot in the opening sequence, thus having him wear the cast for the entire film.

This film was released as Kick Boxer 2 in Europe. It was featured briefly in the film The King of the Kickboxers, which was also produced by Seasonal Film and, coincidentally, has been released as No Retreat, No Surrender 4 and Karate Tiger 4.

Release

Home media
The film was released on VHS in 1991 by Imperial Entertainment in the United States and by CFP Video in Canada. It was never released on Region 1 DVD and as of 2009, there have been no plans to do so. It has however been readily available on Region 4 DVD and Region 2 DVD in both Australia and Europe since 2005.

In August 2004, DVD was released by Universal Studios at the UK in Region 2.

References

External links
 

1990 films
1990 action films
American action films
Films set in the United States
No Retreat, No Surrender films
1990s English-language films
1990s American films